Bob Straetman (born 29 December 1997) is a Belgian footballer who plays for KFC Merelbeke.

References

Belgian footballers
Belgian Pro League players
1997 births
Living people
K.S.C. Lokeren Oost-Vlaanderen players
R.E. Virton players
Association football forwards
People from Dendermonde
Footballers from East Flanders